The 2006 San Jose State Spartans football team represented San Jose State University in the 2006 NCAA Division I FBS football season. The team played their home games at Spartan Stadium in San Jose, California. They participated as members of the Western Athletic Conference. They were coached by head coach Dick Tomey.

Personnel

Coaching staff

Roster

Schedule
Source:

Game summaries

at Washington

Stanford

Cal Poly

San Diego State

Utah State

at Nevada

Louisiana Tech

at New Mexico State

No. 13 Boise State

at Hawai'i

at Idaho

Fresno State

at New Mexico (New Mexico Bowl)

Awards
Safety Dwight Lowery was selected as an All-American.

References

San Jose State
San Jose State Spartans football seasons
New Mexico Bowl champion seasons
San Jose State Spartans football